Registration districts were created in England and Wales with the introduction of civil registration by the Births and Deaths Registration Act 1836. Each district is headed by a superintendent registrar who holds overall responsibility for the administration of civil registration within their district. Historically, each district was divided into sub-districts, which were each headed by a registrar.

The boundaries of registration districts were originally coterminous with poor law unions; however, the number of districts and their boundaries varied considerably over time, with smaller districts being merged and larger districts split in line with population changes. Registration districts were not always coterminous with county boundaries, even following the creation of administrative counties and districts by the Local Government Act 1888, and so were grouped into registration counties for census purposes until the 1930s, when their boundaries were fully aligned with local counties and county boroughs.

In England and Wales, the responsibility for civil registration is today held by the relevant county council, unitary authority, metropolitan district, or London borough. Local government areas often contained several registration districts operating under the supervision of the local authority; however, a series of mergers in the late 2000s and early 2010s means that the boundaries of registration districts are now identical to those of local authorities.

Current
This list is complete and up to date as of April 2020.

Former

Source:

References

Administrative divisions of England